Elections were held in the Australian state of Victoria on Saturday 18 June 1949 to elect 17 of the 34 members of the state's Legislative Council for six year terms. MLCs were elected in single-member provinces using preferential voting.

Results

Legislative Council

|}

Retiring Members
Sir George Goudie (Country, North Western) had died prior to the election; no by-election was held.

Labor
Percy Clarey MLC (Doutta Galla)

Liberal and Country
Alfred Pittard MLC (Ballarat)

Candidates
Sitting members are shown in bold text. Successful candidates are highlighted in the relevant colour. Where there is possible confusion, an asterisk (*) is also used.

See also
1950 Victorian state election

References

1949 elections in Australia
Elections in Victoria (Australia)
Results of Victorian state elections
1940s in Victoria (Australia)
June 1949 events in Australia